The Day the Laughter Died, Part II is a comedy album by American comedian Andrew Dice Clay, released in 1993. It was produced by Rick Rubin. The album was a sequel to 1990's The Day the Laughter Died and repeated the original album's concept to record an unadvertised performance at Rodney Dangerfield's club, Dangerfield's.

Unlike the first album, which got positive reviews and ended on a high note, this album got mostly negative reviews and ended with Clay going out into the crowd after an audience member with whom he was having an argument. That incident, and the album in general, nearly destroyed Clay's career.

Track listing 

 "'Tis the Season" – 0:23
 "Thermometers" – 0:14
 "Gas (Feminine)" – 3:07
 "Deef & Dumb" – 1:34
 "The Notes" – 0:48
 "Sound" – 1:29
 "The Wedding" – 4:04
 "Critics" – 3:22
 "Pink Dot" – 1:54
 "My First Concert" – 2:09
 "Chinese" – 0:17
 "More Notes" – 2:06
 "Dr. Dice" – 0:20
 "Rice" – 1:19
 "Film & Video" – 1:46
 "Bachlorette Party" – 4:15
 "Tom & The Philippino" – 2:58
 "Wife Tells All" – 1:54
 "Surprise" – 3:52
 "Games" – 1:05
 "Talk to 'Em" – 0:32
 "Chinks" – 2:47
 "Mad Max" – 3:15
 "Sealed With a Kiss" – 1:48
 "The Contractor" – 2:20
 "Songs" – 7:48
 "Chinese Restaurant" – 1:50
 "Greeting Cards" – 1:47
 "No Poems" – 3:00
 "The Argument" – 5:32

References 

Andrew Dice Clay albums
1993 live albums
Sequel albums
Albums produced by Rick Rubin
American Recordings (record label) live albums
1990s comedy albums
Live comedy albums
Spoken word albums by American artists
Live spoken word albums
Stand-up comedy albums